Robalzotan (NAD-299, AZD-7371) is a selective antagonist at the 5-HT1A receptor. It was shown to completely reverse the autoreceptor-mediated inhibition of serotonin release induced by the administration of selective serotonin reuptake inhibitors like citalopram in rodent studies. It was subsequently investigated by AstraZeneca as a potential antidepressant but like many other 5-HT1A ligands was discontinued. Later on it was researched for other indications such as irritable bowel syndrome but was dropped once again.

See also 
 Ebalzotan
 UH-301

References 

Amines
Carboxamides
Benzopyrans
Fluoroarenes
Cyclobutyl compounds